Goradil (also, Gerodil’, Goradil’, and Gorodil’) is a village and the least populous municipality in the Absheron Rayon of Azerbaijan. It has a population of 2000.

References 

Populated places in Absheron District